Rafael Ballesteros (born 1938) is a Spanish poet living in Málaga, Spain.  He was a member of Spain's national legislature and helped draft its post-Franco constitution.  Ballesteros is the author of numerous works of poetry and criticism, including the collection of poems Los dominios de la emoción which was released in 2003 by Pre-textos.  He is also the founder of Editorial Veramar, a publisher of experimental literature in Spain. His poetry has been translated into French, Arabic, Romanian, English, Hungarian and Italian.

References

20th-century Spanish poets
Living people
1938 births
Spanish male poets
21st-century Spanish poets
People from Málaga
20th-century Spanish male writers
21st-century Spanish male writers